Jim Ned High School is a public high school located in Tuscola, Texas, United States and is classified as a 3A school by the UIL.  It is part of the Jim Ned Consolidated Independent School District, which also includes Lawn Elementary, Buffalo Gap Elementary and Jim Ned Middle School. The high school serves around 400 students from roughly 380 square miles in southeastern Taylor County, including the towns of Tuscola, Buffalo Gap, and Lawn. A small portion of northeastern Runnels County lies within the district, also.  The district and the school are both named after the Jim Ned Creek, which runs through all three towns. The creek is named after Jim Ned, who was an Indian cavalry scout for the United States Army.  In 2015, the school was rated "Met Standard" by the Texas Education Agency.

Extracurricular activities are offered in the form of performing arts, clubs, and a singular student made newsletter.

Athletics
The Jim Ned Indians compete in: 
cross-country,
volleyball,
football,
basketball, 
powerlifting,
golf,
tennis,
track,
softball,
baseball.

State titles
One-act play
2016(3A)
Boys tennis- Brantson Reese Cook
2013(2A), 2014(2A), 2015(3A), 2016(3A)
Girls' basketball
1994(2A), 2008(2A)
Girls' cross-country
2003(2A)
Girls' golf
2011(2A)
Football
2020(3A/D1)

State finalists
One-act play
2013(2A)
Boys' basketball
2005(2A), 2008(2A)
Football
2003(2A/D1)
2020(3A/D1)

Academics
UIL Academic Meet champions
2008(2A)
2011(2A)
Social studies individual state champion 2015: Josh Buske (3A)
Social studies individual state champion 2016: Josh Buske (3A)
Accounting team state champions 2015 (3A)
State champion in one-act play 2016 (3A)
Current Issues and Events team state champions 2022 (3A)

Notable alumni
Colt McCoy - NFL quarterback, played college football at the University of Texas-Austin
Ed Sprinkle – former NFL lineman, National Football League 1940s All-Decade Team

References

External links

 Jim Ned History
 Jim Ned CISD

Public high schools in Texas
High schools in Taylor County, Texas